Henry Campbell Brady (5 October 1891 – 27 June 1947) was an Australian rules footballer who played with Melbourne in the Victorian Football League (VFL).

Notes

External links 

1891 births
Australian rules footballers from Victoria (Australia)
Melbourne Football Club players
South Ballarat Football Club players
Australian military personnel of World War I
1947 deaths